may refer to the following Japanese railway lines:

 Iyotetsu Jōhoku Line, a light rail line operated by Iyotetsu in Matsuyama, Ehime Prefecture
 Meitetsu Jōhoku Line, a former name of the current Meitetsu Komaki Line in Aichi Prefecture
 Tōkai Transport Service Jōhoku Line, operated by Tokai Transport Service Company in Aichi Prefecture